Chicago is an American rock band from Chicago, Illinois. Formed in February 1967, the group was originally known as The Big Thing and later Chicago Transit Authority, before becoming Chicago in 1969. Initially featuring guitarist and vocalist Terry Kath, keyboardist and vocalist Robert Lamm, drummer Danny Seraphine, saxophonist Walter Parazaider, trumpeter Lee Loughnane and trombonist James Pankow, the band added bassist and vocalist Peter Cetera in December 1967. The group has been through many lineup changes and currently includes four original members – Lamm, Loughnane, Pankow, and Parazaider (retired member since 2017) – plus drummer Walfredo Reyes Jr. (since 2012), saxophonist Ray Herrmann (since 2016), vocalist Neil Donell (since 2018), percussionist Ramon "Ray" Yslas (since 2018), guitarist Tony Obrohta (since 2021), Loren Gold on keyboards and vocals (since 2022), and bassist Eric Baines (since 2022).

History

1967–2009
Chicago was formed under the name The Big Thing on February 15, 1967, with the original lineup comprising guitarist and vocalist Terry Kath, keyboardist and vocalist Robert Lamm, drummer Danny Seraphine, saxophonist Walter Parazaider, trumpeter Lee Loughnane and trombonist James Pankow. In December, bassist Peter Cetera was added to the band, which was soon renamed Chicago Transit Authority. After the release of a self-titled debut album in April 1969, the band shortened its name to simply Chicago after receiving a threat of legal action from the Chicago Transit Authority. The group's lineup remained stable for over ten years and released a series commercially and critically successful albums. In 1974, percussionist Laudir de Oliveira was added as an eighth member of the band after contributing to Chicago VI and VII as a guest musician. On January 23, 1978, however, the band suffered its first personnel loss when Kath accidentally killed himself with a gunshot to the head.

The band briefly considered breaking up after Kath's death, but ultimately chose to continue and added Donnie Dacus as his replacement in April 1978. After just two albums, Dacus was dismissed from Chicago in February 1980. He was replaced by Chris Pinnick, who was initially credited as an additional contributor but later upgraded to a full band member. After the release of Chicago XIV, the band was complemented on tour by Marty Grebb on saxophone, guitar and keyboards. At the end of the album's touring cycle, de Oliveira left Chicago. In late 1981, after being dropped by Columbia Records, the band started working with David Foster as its new producer, who introduced keyboardist, guitarist and vocalist Bill Champlin to the lineup.  Cetera's brother, Kenny, performed background vocals on Chicago 17, and was also added as a touring percussionist and background singer after its release in 1984. Despite renewed commercial success for the group, Cetera left Chicago in July 1985 to focus on his solo career. Pinnick left around the same time.

Cetera was replaced in September 1985 by Jason Scheff, son of former Elvis Presley bassist Jerry Scheff. Pinnick was not replaced until the following July, when former Bob Seger's Silver Bullet Band guitarist Dawayne Bailey joined the group. Chicago lost another founding member in May 1990, when Seraphine was fired and replaced by Tris Imboden. After voicing his frustration with the cancellation of Stone of Sisyphus in 1994, Bailey's contract was not renewed and he was dismissed from the band. Bruce Gaitsch initially filled in on guitar, including the recording of 1995's Night & Day: Big Band, before Keith Howland was hired as Bailey's replacement in January 1995. Chicago's lineup remained stable throughout the rest of the 1990s and the 2000s, save for the addition of several touring substitutes at various times, including trombonist Nick Lane in place of Pankow, saxophonist Larry Klimas in place of Parazaider, and trumpeter Lee Thornburg in place of Loughnane.

2009 onwards
In 2009, after substituting for Imboden on drums at a number of shows, Drew Hester joined Chicago on percussion. Shortly thereafter, Champlin left Chicago after 28 years with the band, reportedly to focus on his solo career. He was replaced on keyboards and vocals by Lou Pardini. Champlin later claimed that he was fired, rather than having left of his own choosing. Hester left in May 2012 to return to focus on drumming. His place was initially taken briefly by Daniel de los Reyes, before his brother Walfredo Reyes Jr. took over more permanently when the former committed full-time to the Zac Brown Band instead. In October 2016, Scheff also left the band after a five-month leave of absence due to "family health issues", with his replacement Jeff Coffey taking over on a permanent basis. The following year, Parazaider retired from touring due to a heart condition, with Ray Herrmann taking his place as an official band member (although Parazaider remained a member of the band, too).

Chicago experienced two lineup changes in January 2018. First Imboden announced on January 17 that he was leaving to spend more time with his new wife, then two days later Coffey followed due to the band's heavy touring schedule. Reyes subsequently switched from percussion to take over Imboden's role on drums, while Coffey was replaced by vocalist Neil Donell and bassist Brett Simons. Daniel de los Reyes filled in on percussion again when the band returned to touring, before Ramon "Ray" Yslas took over on a permanent basis. On November 15, 2021, Howland took a leave from the group after breaking his arm in an accident, with guitarist Tony Obrohta substituting for him at concerts. On December 1, 2021, Howland announced he was leaving Chicago after over 26 years, citing the recent accident and lengthy recovery period as bringing about the next phase of his life. Tony Obrohta joined the group to replace Howland in December 2021. On January 21, 2022, Lou Pardini announced his departure from the band. Loren Gold, who had substituted for Pardini in August and September 2021, began appearing with the group on vocals and keyboards for tour dates starting in January 2022. Gold officially joined the band on keyboards and vocals in March 2022. On Friday, May 6, 2022, Chicago announced on their website that Brett Simons had departed the band and Eric Baines (bass, backing vocals) had joined the group.

Band members

Current

Former

Touring musicians

Touring substitutes

Timelines

Members

Recording

Lineups

Notes

References

External links
Chicago official website

Chicago